The 1916 Quebec general election was held on May 22, 1916, to elect members of the 14th Legislative Assembly of the Province of Quebec, Canada.  The incumbent Quebec Liberal Party, led by Lomer Gouin, was re-elected, defeating the Quebec Conservative Party, led by Philémon Cousineau.

Results

See also
 List of Quebec premiers
 Politics of Quebec
 Timeline of Quebec history
 List of Quebec political parties
 14th Legislative Assembly of Quebec

Further reading
 

Quebec general election
Elections in Quebec
General election
Quebec general election